Mr. Vocalist X'Mas is the eighth studio album by American singer-songwriter Eric Martin. Released on November 11, 2009 exclusively in Japan by Sony Music Japan, the album features Martin's covers of Japanese and western Christmas songs.

The album peaked at No. 26 on Oricon's albums chart.

Track listing

Charts

References

External links
 
 

2009 Christmas albums
Eric Martin (musician) albums
Sony Music Entertainment Japan albums
Christmas albums by American artists
Covers albums